Snow Valley Mountain Resort is a ski resort located in Running Springs, California, United States. It is the oldest continually operating ski resort in Southern California and is also one of four ski resorts in the San Bernardino National Forest.

Originally named "Fish Camp" for the pond located in the area, the site was developed into a roadside resort and lumber mill in the 1920s by the Swetkowich brothers. In the 1930s the slopes were developed for tobogganing and skiing by the Arrowhead Springs Corporation, which named the development Snow Valley. The resort featured one of the first overhead cable ski lifts. In 1940 the resort was purchased by Norwegian-American ski jump champion Johnny Elvrum, who expanded it.

In 1974 W.R. Sauey became the owner of Snow Valley. His company the Nordic Group owned and operated Snow Valley. In January 2023, Snow Valley was acquired by Alterra Mountain Company, operator of nearby resorts Bear Mountain and Snow Summit.

The resort operates under Special Use Permit from the United States Forest Service.

Lifts
The facilities include 12 Lifts: 1 six-passenger, high-speed chair; 5 double chairs, 5 triple chairs, 2 surface lifts/moving carpets. The main lift, lift 1, dubbed "Snow valley express" travels 4,558 feet to Race Peak and can carry up to 6. Once at Race peak there are multiple runs down, most notably 'the edge' terrain park, upper/lower wine rock, and Mambo alley.

The previous main lift of the resort is lift 1, which was 4,701 feet long. It had a mid station that is right next to a restaurant called "Dear Meadow Grille". When at the top, it leads to moderate, advanced, and expert runs. When lift 1 is busy, another lift that goes a little lower than lift 1 is called lift 2. It goes 3,688 feet, and unloads skiers at a little hill called Race Peak. From here, there is one intermediate run, and 4 advanced runs. Most of these advanced runs are closed at the beginning and end of the season due to a lack of natural snow.

References

External links
 

 Snow Valley Website

Ski areas and resorts in California
Sports venues in San Bernardino County, California